Mountain Strawberries 3 (산딸기 3 - Sanddalgi 3), also known as Wild Strawberries 3, is a 1987 South Korean film directed by Kim Su-hyeong. It was the third entry in the Mountain Strawberries series.

Synopsis
A young woman in a village is involved in romantic entanglements during the preparation of a festival celebration.

Cast
 Seonu Il-ran
 Ma Hung-sik
 Kim Kuk-hyeon
 Jang Mi-yeong
 Moon Tai-sun
 Park Yong-pal
 Chung Kyoo-young
 Han Song-i
 Park Jong-sel
 Im Jae-min

Bibliography

English

Korean

Notes

1987 films
South Korean erotic films
1980s Korean-language films
South Korean sequel films